Ajtani is a village in Nurmahal. Nurmahal is a sub-tehsil in the district Jalandhar of the Indian state of Punjab.

About
Ajtani lies on the Nurmahal-Rajowal main road at a distance of 3 km from it.  The nearest Railway station to this village is Nurmahal railway station at a distance of 8 km.

Post code
Ajtani's Post office is Kot Badal Khan, postal code (PIN) 144039.

References

Villages in Jalandhar district